Yang Yanyong (born May 5, 1994) is a Chinese baseball outfielder and pitcher who plays with the Shanghai Golden Eagles in the China Baseball League. 

Yang represented China at the 2013 World Baseball Classic, 2017 World Baseball Classic and 2018 Asian Games.

References

1994 births
Living people
Asian Games competitors for China
Baseball outfielders
Baseball pitchers
Baseball players at the 2018 Asian Games
Chinese expatriate baseball players in the United States
Shanghai Golden Eagles players
Texas AirHogs players
2013 World Baseball Classic players
2017 World Baseball Classic players